A State of Trance 2015 is the twelfth compilation album in the A State of Trance compilation series mixed and compiled by Dutch DJ and record producer Armin van Buuren. It was released on 27 March 2015 by Armada Music.
The album received an 8/10 rating from Mixmag, with Ellie Hanagan calling it "energetic and exciting". It charted in both the Netherlands and Switzerland.

Track listing

Release history

References

Armin van Buuren compilation albums
Electronic compilation albums
2015 compilation albums